Lt. Gen. Tamás Kovács (13 December 1940 – 26 April 2020) was a Hungarian military officer and jurist, who served as Chief Prosecutor of Hungary from 2006 to 2010.

He served as Army Chief Prosecutor since 1990. He was nominated for the position by President László Sólyom. The National Assembly appointed him for 6-year term. However Kovács reached the age of 70 in 2010, and, under the laws, he was replaced by Péter Polt on his 70th birthday, who was elected on 7 December 2010 by the National Assembly.

References
 Kovács Tamás katonai főügyész lehet a legfőbb ügyész Index.hu
 Meghalt Kovács Tamás volt legfőbb ügyész, 24.hu

1940 births
2020 deaths
Hungarian jurists
Hungarian generals
People from Tolna County